The Ontario Charitable Gaming Association (OCGA) administers charitable gaming for non-profit organizations in Ontario, Canada.

The OCGA is a non-government, provincial association which helps charities and non-profit organizations raise funds through pull tabs and bingo games. The association is populated with the member charities it serves.

Charities in Ontario raise more than $150 million CAD.

External links
OCGA official website

Organizations based in Ontario